Kermia episema is a species of sea snail, a marine gastropod mollusk in the family Raphitomidae.

Description
The length of the shell attains 4.5 mm, its diameter 1.25 mm.

(Original description) This neat little species has the usual fusiform shape,. It contains five whorls, exclusive of the apical, not present in our specimens. The whorls are clathrate, with longitudinal ribs and spiral lirae, these being pale ochreous-white, the interstices darker ochreous. The body whorl is slightly prolonged and sculptured in the same way as the upper whorls. One or two of the longitudinal ribs seem thicker than the others, giving a very slightly varicose appearance. The columellar margin is straight, simple, six denticled. The outer lip is incrassate, six denticled within. The sinus is deep 
and large.

Distribution
This marine species occurs off Taiwan to Australia; also off the Fiji Islands, Cook Islands, New Caledonia

References

 Higo, S., Callomon, P. & Goto, Y. (1999) Catalogue and Bibliography of the Marine Shell-Bearing Mollusca of Japan. Elle Scientific Publications, Yao, Japan, 749 pp.
  Liu J.Y. [Ruiyu] (ed.). (2008). Checklist of marine biota of China seas. China Science Press. 1267 pp.

External links
 
 Gastropods.com: Kermia episema
  Hedley, C. 1922. A revision of the Australian Turridae. Records of the Australian Museum 13(6): 213-359, pls 42-56 

episema
Gastropods described in 1896